The following is a list of the 162 communes of the Hautes-Alpes department of France.

The communes cooperate in the following intercommunalities (as of 2020):
Communauté d'agglomération Gap-Tallard-Durance (partly)
Communauté de communes du Briançonnais
Communauté de communes Buëch Dévoluy
Communauté de communes Champsaur-Valgaudemar
Communauté de communes du Guillestrois et du Queyras
Communauté de communes du Pays des Écrins
Communauté de communes de Serre-Ponçon (partly)
Communauté de communes Serre-Ponçon Val d'Avance (partly)
Communauté de communes du Sisteronais Buëch (partly)

References

Hautes-Alpes